This is a list of Austin City Limits Music Festival lineups by year.

2002 
2002 was the inaugural year of the festival. Unlike subsequent years, it was a 2-day event only. The festival, arranged by Charlie Jones and Charles Attal founders of C3 Presents, was thrown together in a matter of three or four months. The 2-day festival hosted 5 stages and 67 bands. One-day passes were $25. 42,000 people attended the event when only 25,000 were expected. The festival has grown every year since.

2003 
September 19–21 marked the second year for the ACL Music festival. With 100 bands performing, tickets increase to $65 for a three-day admission pass. Children under 10 were admitted for free when accompanied by an adult with a ticket.

2004 

The 2004 festival took place on September 17, 18, and 19.

The 2004 festival had eight stages, and, on the second day of the festival, a top attendance of 75,000 people. This spike in attendance forced the festival promoters to lower capacity per the request of surrounding neighborhood associations.

2005 
The 2005 festival took place on September 23, 24, and 25.

The 2005 Austin City Limits Festival won Pollstar's Festival of the Year Award. This was also the infamous "Dust Bowl" year where dust kicked up by the festival crowd made it difficult for audiences to breathe. The following year, sprinklers were installed in Zilker Park to remedy this problem. Organizers reduced the daily capacity of the event by 10,000 fans because of neighborhood disputes in the previous years. Three-day passes were sold for $105.

Last minute replacement acts included:

 Deadboy and the Elephantmen
 The Texiles featuring members of The Iguanas

 The Double
 Tracy Bonham and more

Several acts were scheduled to appear, but cancelled due to transportation issues arising from Hurricane Rita, they included:

 Bettye LaVette
 The Lost Trailers
 Nine Black Alps
 Kathleen Edwards
 Mindy Smith

 Ditty Bops
 Tegan and Sara
 Missy Higgins

 Kate York
 Los Aterciopelados
 Naturally 7 and numerous others.

2006 
The 2006 festival took place on September 15, 16, and 17.

After sweltering heat in 2005, festival organizers attempted to relieve festival goers from the Texas sun by adding more misting and water stations and more tents for shade. Organizers also added a mobile phone texting feature to the festival. AT&T's Blue Room offered options for fans to watch live streaming bands playing from the comfort of their own homes.

Ben Kweller suffered a nosebleed during his set. He attempted to stem the flow by inserting a tampon, thrown to him by an audience member, into his nostril. The tampon expanded painfully and then he removed it. Kweller performed two more songs until he had to leave the stage. The next day when The Flaming Lips performed, lead singer Wayne Coyne asked the audience to throw tampons at him to help mop up his signature fake blood. It continued to rain tampons on the band for well over two songs.

2007 
The 2007 Austin City Limits Music Festival occurred September 14, 15, and 16 in Zilker Park. Several acts, including Amy Winehouse, The White Stripes and Rodrigo y Gabriela, cancelled their appearances at the festival due to health reasons, the latter two on very short notice. The scheduled performance by Saturday headliner, The White Stripes was replaced by moving already scheduled Muse into the headlining slot.

Other notable moments include Friday when a propane tank was ignited and a fire broke out in the service area, burning down two trailers and several port-o-potties. Four people who were working at the festival were injured, two of them seriously. A second fire broke out on the speaker stack at the AT&T stage during Björk's set, but it was quickly extinguished and no injuries were reported.

2008 
The 2008 edition took place September 26–28, 2008.

2009 
The 2009 festival took place on October 2–4, 2009. This year's festival is most commonly remembered as the one when torrential rains which started falling on Saturday afternoon turned the new grass turf into slick fields of Dillo Dirt mud.

2010 

The 2010 festival took place on October 8–10, 2010.
The performers included The Eagles, Phish, Muse, The Strokes, and M.I.A.

2011 
ACL Festival celebrated its 10th Anniversary on September 16–18, 2011.  The official lineup was announced on May 17, 2011.

2012 
Austin City Limits took place from October 12–14, 2012. The official lineup was announced on May 22, 2012.

2013 
For the first time, the Austin City Limits Music Festival was split across two weekends with matching lineups: October 4–6 and October 11–13, 2013.

Weekend 1

Weekend 2 
Due to heavy rains and flash floods, the festival was cancelled on Day 3 of Weekend 2.

2014 
Austin City Limits Music Festival was held over 2 weekends: October 3–5 and October 10–12, 2014. It was listed in Forbes as one of 5 American Music Festivals to look forward to.

Weekend 1

Weekend 2

2015 
Austin City Limits Music Festival was held over 2 weekends: October 2–4 and October 9–11, 2015. The lineup featured headliners Foo Fighters, Drake, the Strokes, Florence and the Machine, and the Weeknd.

Weekend 1

Weekend 2

2016 
Austin City Limits Music Festival was held over 2 weekends: September 30 – October 2 and October 7–9, 2016. The lineup featured headliners Radiohead, Kygo, Kendrick Lamar, Mumford & sons, and LCD Soundsystem.

Weekend 1

Weekend 2

2017 
Austin City Limits Music Festival was held over 2 weekends: October 6–8 and October 13–15, 2017. The lineup featured headliners Jay Z, Red Hot Chili Peppers, Chance The Rapper, The Killers, and Gorillaz.

Weekend 1

2018 

Austin City Limits Music Festival was held over 2 weekends: October 5–7 and October 12–14, 2018. The lineup featured headliners Paul McCartney, Metallica, Arctic Monkeys, Travis Scott, Odesza, and The National. Childish Gambino was forced to cancel his performance after a foot injury, and Justice was promoted from an earlier time slot to replace him as a headliner. Phoenix and Lil Wayne were also added to fill the empty time slots, with the former playing on the first weekend of the festival and the latter on the second weekend.

Weekend 1

Weekend 2

2019
2019 Austin City Limits Music Festival was held over two weekends: October 4–6 and 11–13. The festival was headlined by Guns N' Roses, Mumford & Sons, Childish Gambino, The Cure, Cardi B (first weekend only), Billie Eilish, Tame Impala, and Robyn (second weekend only).

2020
2020 Austin City Limits Music Festival was held virtually due to the COVID-19 pandemic in Austin, Texas. The festival was held on October 9–11 and streamed previous festivals as well as live performances.

Friday
Billie Eilish (2019)
Twenty One Pilots (2015)
Willie Nelson (2016)
Nathaniel Rateliff & the Night Sweats (2016)
Spoon (2017)
Paul Cauthen
Mélat
Durand Jones & The Indications (2018)

Saturday
Queens of the Stone Age (2013)
Radiohead (2016)
LCD Soundsystem (2010)
St. Vincent (2018)
Juanes (2014)
Black Pumas
Otis the Destroyer
Phoenix (2018)
Zhu (2017)
Sylvan Esso (2018)

Sunday
Phish (2010)
My Morning Jacket (2011)
The xx (2017)
Paul McCartney (2018)
Gary Clark Jr. (2019)
Jackie Venson
Mobley
Los Coast
The String Cheese Incident (2003)
Alabama Shakes (2015)

2021
2021 Austin City Limits Music Festival was held over two weekends: October 1–3 and 8–10. The headliners were George Strait, Billie Eilish, Tyler, the Creator, Miley Cyrus, Rüfüs Du Sol, and Duran Duran.

References 

Lineups
Lists of musicians